Halo: Combat Evolved Anniversary is a 2011 first-person shooter video game developed by 343 Industries, Saber Interactive and Certain Affinity. It is a remaster of Halo: Combat Evolved (2001), developed by Bungie. Publisher Microsoft announced Anniversary alongside Halo 4 at the 2011 Electronic Entertainment Expo. It was released in November 2011, the 10th anniversary of the original Halo, for the Xbox 360 console, and re-released as part of Halo: The Master Chief Collection for the Xbox One in November 2014. A Windows version was released in March 2020.

343 Industries, overseers of the Halo franchise, approached Saber Interactive to develop a remake of Halo for the anniversary. Saber used its proprietary game engine to reproduce the graphics and the original Halo engine for gameplay. A development tool for toggling between the old and new visuals became a game feature. Anniversarys enhancements include a complete high-definition visual overhaul, support for cooperative and multiplayer gameplay via the Xbox Live online service, new and remastered sound effects and music, and extras such as achievements and in-game collectibles. It is the first Halo game to include Kinect support.

Critical reception to Anniversary was generally positive. The updated graphics, sounds, and ability to toggle between the remastered and original visuals were praised. Complaints included technical glitches, faults with the original game's level design, and the multiplayer implementation.

Gameplay 

Halo: Combat Evolved Anniversary and the original, Halo: Combat Evolved, are identical in gameplay and plot. The game is a first-person shooter with portions of vehicular combat taking place from a third-person perspective. The plot follows the player character and protagonist Master Chief, a supersoldier, as he fights the alien Covenant on the mysterious ancient ringworld Halo. Players are equipped with a recharging energy shield that absorbs damage; players also have health that can only be replenished by health packs scattered across the game's levels. A variety of human and alien weapons and vehicles can be used.

Players can switch between the "classic" graphics of the original game and new graphics developed for the remake by pressing the Back button on the controller. The classic and new graphics are presented in high-definition, 16:9 widescreen compared to the original game's 480i resolution and 4:3 aspect ratio. The remastered graphics are also available in stereoscopic 3D for compatible televisions.

Additions to the gameplay include Xbox Live achievements, online cooperative gameplay, and hidden content: video terminals that provide additional plot information, and collectible skulls that modify gameplay when activated. Support for Xbox Kinect includes voice commands for video navigation, in-combat directives, and environment-scanning, which adds on-screen items to an encyclopedia called the Library.

The original Combat Evolved did not support online multiplayer, but players could play multiplayer locally via split-screen or System Link LAN. Anniversary adds revamped multiplayer and two-player co-op campaign support available both online via Xbox Live and offline locally. The game's multiplayer mode uses Halo: Reachs engine and features seven remakes of Combat Evolved and Halo 2 maps. Anniversary also includes a new map based on Halos eponymous campaign level for Firefight, a wave-based survival multiplayer game type in which players and their allies fight enemy groups of scaling difficulty. Anniversary introduced artificially intelligent Firefight allies to the series.

Plot 

After fleeing the Covenant's destruction of the human world Reach, the human ship Pillar of Autumn makes a random slipspace jump to avoid leading the Covenant to Earth. Arriving in uncharted space, the crew of the Autumn discover a massive ringworld orbiting a gas giant. When the Covenant attack, Autumns captain, Jacob Keyes, entrusts the ship's AI, Cortana—and her knowledge of defense deployments and the location of Earth—to the supersoldier known as the Master Chief for safekeeping. The Master Chief fights off Covenant boarding parties and leaves the Autumn via a lifeboat for the surface of the ringworld while Keyes directs the Autumn to "land" on the ring.

On the ringworld, the Chief rallies human survivors and leads a boarding party to rescue Keyes from the Covenant's clutches. Keyes reveals that the Covenant call the ring "Halo", and they believe it is some sort of weapon. The Chief is tasked with finding Halo's control room before the Covenant does. Once Cortana is inserted into the control room, she becomes alarmed and stays behind while she sends the Master Chief to find Keyes. While searching for the captain, the Master Chief encounters the Flood, a parasitic organism that infects sentient life. The release prompts Halo's caretaker, the AI 343 Guilty Spark, to enlist the Chief's help in activating Halo's defenses. The Chief's activation of the ring from the Control Room is stopped by Cortana, who reveals that Halo's defenses do not kill Flood, but rather their food in an effort to starve them—meaning that activating the ring would wipe out all sentient life in the galaxy. To stop the Flood from spreading and Spark from activating the ring, Cortana devises a plan to detonate the crashed Autumns engines and destroy Halo, but they will need to get Keyes’s implant to connect to the ship. But Chief and Cortana find out that Keyes has converted into the flood, Chief removes the Captain’s implant and they set on a path to the Autumn. Fighting through Flood, Covenant, and Guilty Spark's robotic Sentinels, the Chief manually destabilizes the Autumns reactors and he and Cortana narrowly escape the destruction of the ring via a Longsword fighter.

Development

Overview 
After Microsoft acquired Bungie in 2000, Bungie developed the original Halo: Combat Evolved as a 2001 launch game for the Xbox. Bungie and Microsoft split in 2007, but the rights to Halo remained with the latter, which formed an internal division to oversee Halo franchise development. 343 Industries, the internal division, approached Saber Interactive with a proposal to remake Combat Evolved for the game's tenth anniversary. Saber's Chief Operating Officer Andrey Iones recalled that the offer was "an opportunity we [could not] miss", as Saber had never before worked on a major game franchise and many team members were fans of Halo. Saber developed concept art to form visual ideas for the remake and then flew to Seattle, Washington, to meet with 343 Industries.

343 Industries wanted a complete remake of the original game by the tenth anniversary of Halos release, giving Saber just over a year to complete the project. The gameplay was to remain unchanged; while the original game had imbalanced elements, 343 Industries decided to preserve the game experience players remembered while introducing young fans to the game for perhaps the first time. The visuals, meanwhile, would be updated along with added features like campaign skulls. Iones recalled that experimentation with the game was limited—redoing keyframed character animations was off-limits because redoing them could introduce gameplay bugs, and design choices like game balance had already been determined. Likewise, porting the PC version of the game back to the Xbox to add features would have constrained the amount of visual improvements Saber could make, as well as require significant time training artists to use the same production pipelines that were used for Combat Evolved. Saber decided to use the original engine for the gameplay and its own for the visuals, despite the compatibility problems this solution presented. Development began under the codename Spark. The game was completed and released to manufacturing ("going gold") on October 15, 2011.

Design 
To solve the issues of transferring information from the original game's engine to the Saber engine, the developers looked at how they used the third-party Havok physics engine to handle object positioning, velocities, and collisions. Saber created a proxy of every object in the Halo engine to transfer into the Saber engine, meaning that the game's original programming remained unchanged.  The game's ability to alternate between the legacy and remastered graphics engines in the campaign was made possible by the rendering engine developed by Saber Interactive. The technology allowed the developers to update Halo: Combat Evolveds visuals and preserve the original gameplay. Originally, players would have chosen which graphical presentation to play from the main menu. The in-game toggle feature quickly became a talking point among the developers, who pushed for it to be available to other players. Since the ability to switch between classic version and remastered version was provided to players, both engines work simultaneously to retain the spontaneity of game. This approach caused several problems, including collision issues—because objects and environments in the original game were of a lower resolution with fewer polygons, higher-resolution visuals in the Saber engine could deviate from the original significantly. As the original game's geometry was used as the basis for collisions, in some cases characters could appear to walk through or above terrain, weapons could drop through the ground, and bullets would appear to be deflected by nothing. The sheer number of these issues, combined with the desire to keep the original gameplay intact, forced Saber to use a variety of approaches to fix the problems, including making tools for artists to visualize height differences and creating intermediate geometry. In some cases, the artists developed other ways of keeping to the same collision data while updating the visuals by changing the actual object—turning a blocky, low-polygon rock into an angular Forerunner structure avoided the collision issues.

Where possible, the developers drew on or adapted assets from Halo 3 and Reach. For elements that had no analogues, Microsoft sent art director Ben Cammarano to Saber's offices in St. Petersburg, Russia, to oversee the redesign of the game's visuals. Cammarano established four tenets of Halo—what Iones termed "heroic vistas, iconic imagery and characters, clean and vibrant aesthetics, and visceral action"—to guide Saber's artists. Since the original assets already existed, concept artists took screenshots from the original game and painted over new looks to show how environmental effects, improved lighting, and new textures could change the look of the levels. Some of Saber's visual designs were considered too much of a departure from the original game—while the artists had changed the position of the Halo ringworld and nearby planets to make a more pleasing skybox, Microsoft insisted maintaining continuity with the universe was more important and vetoed the changes. Vocal fans pointed out other inconsistencies with the game's visuals in pre-release trailers and pictures that Saber ultimately changed. Iones pointed to the floor designs of the Forerunner structures, the assault rifle, and the look of the Chief as places fans had an impact. The Chief's armor was redesigned from scratch instead of porting existing assets.

Saber doubted that it would be able to convert Combat Evolveds split-screen cooperative play to facilitate online play. Greg Hermann, a 343 Industries technical lead who had experience with Bungie technology, assisted Saber in development of a networking solution that would allow online co-op. Since the original game would behave identically when given the same scenario and inputs, only the player inputs needed to be synchronized between players' Xbox consoles.

Because of its previous contributions to the series—Halo 2s Blastacular and Halo: Reachs Defiant map pack—Certain Affinity was approached by 343 Industries to streamline the multiplayer maps to take Halo: Reachs gameplay options into account. The multiplayer is powered by the Halo: Reach engine. 343 Industries director Frank O'Connor said that the decision to use Reach for the multiplayer was controversial, even within the studio. "In Halos day, there was never a proper networking mode," O'Connor explained. "We couldn't roll back the technology; [recreating Halos local area network multiplayer] just wouldn't have worked with things like latency and all other modern Xbox Live-related problems. So we would have had to build it from scratch, and it still wouldn't have been the experience [players] remember." An additional consideration O'Connor mentioned was that producing a full replication of Combat Evolveds multiplayer would have divided the Halo player base and interrupted Reachs lifespan. In choosing which seven Halo maps to remake, 343 Industries set a number of rules—the map could not have been previously remade for a 360-era Halo title, it had to work with Reachs gameplay sandbox, and it had to be a fan favorite. The company retained the same art director between the campaign and multiplayer elements of Anniversary to make sure the two halves of the game looked visually cohesive.

Since 343 Industries developed Halo 4 concurrently with the anniversary edition, it decided to use Halo: Combat Evolved Anniversary to link the original trilogy with the upcoming Reclaimer trilogy by means of in-game collectibles similar to Halo 3s terminals, Halo 3: ODSTs audio logs, and Halo: Reachs data pads. While the other games' collectibles were aimed at and enjoyed by serious Halo fiction fans, 343 Industries wanted to make Anniversarys terminals higher-budget, more impressive, and accessible to all players.

Though Iones described Anniversarys one-year development cycle as a "very smooth ride", some production issues that were not discovered until late in development contributed to bugs and other problems. Saber relied on a partially automated tool to render the game's cinematics, but did not do a thorough vetting of the results until after the game had reached the alpha stage of its release cycle. As a result, the developers realized that their addition of motion capture animation and lip-syncing had caused serious audio syncing issues and animation bugs.

Audio 
The developers refreshed Combat Evolveds music and sound effects along with its visuals. While players can toggle the original music from Halo: Combat Evolved, the soundtrack was also re-recorded in partnership with Pyramind Studios, using the 75-piece Skywalker Symphony Orchestra and the Chanticleer vocal ensemble. Because there were no MIDI recordings of the original game's music, Paul Lipson, Lennie Moore, Tom Salta, and Brian Trifon transcribed each piece of music.

The soundtrack was released digitally and in two physical formats: a two-disc CD edition and a vinyl record edition, the latter of which was limited to 2000 units. The vinyl edition contains 16 tracks on two sides and comes with a code to download the rest of the Anniversary soundtrack digitally. The compact disc edition contains thirty-nine tracks and was released on November 15, 2011.

Release 

Halo: Combat Evolved Anniversary was announced to the public with a trailer on June 6, 2011, at Microsoft's annual E3 global media briefing, which closed with the teaser trailer for Halo 4. Bonuses for preordering the game included a Master Chief Xbox 360 avatar costume and an exclusive Grunt Funeral skull, which toggles whether enemy Grunts explode upon death. During the Halo Universe panel at the 2011 San Diego Comic-Con, a short trailer showcasing the animation used in the terminals with a narration by 343 Guilty Spark was shown to the fans. Microsoft launched the Halo Living Monument, consisting of a live-action short and a website, to celebrate the launch of Combat Evolved Anniversary.

Thirteen retail Microsoft Stores hosted launch events for Anniversarys November 15, 2011, midnight release; festivities included sixteen-player multiplayer matches, limited-edition giveaways, and appearances by the game developers. In the United Kingdom, Microsoft and the British video game retailer GAME held two pre-release events with the full version of the game and prizes. In another British promotion, those who purchased a special Halo-themed Pizza Hut pizza during a two-week promotional period surrounding the release date received two days of Xbox Live premium membership. VideoGamer.com's staff found the pizza to be delicious, but its connection to the Halo franchise tenuous. Microsoft and Pizza Hut would run a similar promotion the next year for Halo 4s release.

As stated by tracking firm Chart-Track, Anniversary was the sixth best-selling game of the week across all platforms in the UK; it attained the fifteenth spot in Japan according to Media Create, while according to Amazon orders, it was the second best-selling game for the 360 platform in the same period. It was the third best-selling Xbox 360 game in North America during its first week.

The game was re-released on the Xbox One as part of Halo: The Master Chief Collection on November 11, 2014, with support for 1080p60 rendering.

In March 2019, a PC version of Halo: Combat Evolved Anniversary was announced as part of Halo: Master Chief Collection for Microsoft Windows. It was released on March 3, 2020.

Reception 

Halo: Combat Evolved Anniversary received generally positive reviews. On aggregate review website Metacritic, the game has a weighted score of 82 out of 100, based on 73 reviews from critics. On GameRankings, the game has an overall score of 81.92% based on reviews from 53 critics. The staff of Official Xbox Magazine praised the developers for preserving the original gameplay, avoiding "revisionist horrors" and Star Wars re-release moments. Brandon Justice of Electronic Gaming Monthly wrote for fans of the series, "[Anniversary] is one of the best pieces of fan service our industry has ever produced, and you need to go buy it."

The remastered visuals were positively received; reviewers such as The Inquirers Chris Martin and The Escapists Russ Pitts singled out the graphics-switch button for praise. The Guardians Steve Boxer called the feature "utterly fascinating—a bit like ... archaeology on your console", and said that the visual overhaul improved areas where the original game engine was weak, such as rendering outdoor environments. While praising most of the game's refinements, Watters singled out the Flood as enemies he thought the original game envisioned better, saying "the simplicity of the classic look feels more sinister and alien". Hamza Aziz of Destructoid appreciated the visual updates, but not some of the resulting audio–animation syncing issues.

Reviewers disagreed on how the core gameplay of Combat Evolved, unaltered in Anniversary, had aged over ten years. Writing for GameSpot, editor Chris Watters opined that "the fundamental mechanics of the game have ... endured well", with responsive controls and challenging enemies. PALGN writer Adam Guetti agreed, praising "rock solid" controls and tight gameplay, while Mike Wilcox of The Sydney Morning Herald argued the anniversary edition "[proves] a game with a winning formula doesn't wither with age". IGN's Steven Hopper felt that the level design was dated, the repetitious environments making it easy for players to lose their bearings, and that vehicles handled poorly. Giant Bomb's Brad Shoemaker wrote that while the best aspects of the game remained, other aspects—such as the level design and fighting the Flood—were no less frustrating after ten years; Digital Spy's Matthew Reynolds echoed the sentiment, praising the game for presenting situations unsurpassed in later games while faulting irregular checkpoints.

Critics had split opinions on Anniversarys additional features. The stereoscopic 3D effect was alternately praised and dismissed: Matt Miller of Game Informer wrote that the feature "doesn't add anything to the experience", while Aziz described the feature as "fantastic", considering its use in Anniversary to be more subtle and pleasing than in other games. Aziz also applauded the narrative terminals, although he criticized the Kinect voice command support for being slower in combat than pressing buttons. Ben Kuchera of Ars Technica enjoyed the improvements of the Halo maps in Anniversarys multiplayer mode, but criticized the inability to play said mode via four-person local split screen as in the original game. Reynolds agreed with 343 Industries's choice to use Reach for Anniversarys multiplayer mode, writing that the map pack offered "a smart way of reintroducing players back into the game", as well as commending Halos combat for offering an alternative to contemporary military shooters.

References

External links 
 
 
 

2011 video games
343 Industries games
Cooperative video games
First-person shooters
Combat Evolved Anniversary
Kinect games
Microsoft games
Multiplayer and single-player video games
Saber Interactive games
Video game remakes
Video games developed in the United States
Video games scored by Lennie Moore
Video games with stereoscopic 3D graphics
Xbox 360 games
Certain Affinity games

fr:Halo: Combat Evolved#Halo: Combat Evolved Anniversary